Paluma Range is a national park located between Ingham and Townsville, in north Queensland, Australia. The park is 1188 km north of Brisbane.

Geography
The park contains the Jourama Falls, Crystal Creek and Lake Paluma.

Ecology
Most of it lies within the Paluma Important Bird Area (IBA), so identified by BirdLife International because it is a southern outlier for many species and contains a significant population of the vulnerable southern cassowary.

History
On National Parks Day 2010 (Sunday, 28 March 2010), the Queensland State Government announced the addition of 6,510 hectares to the Paluma Range National Park.

See also

 Protected areas of Queensland

References

External links
 Queensland State Government announcement

National parks of Queensland
North Queensland
Protected areas established in 1994
1994 establishments in Australia
Important Bird Areas of Queensland